Hong is the common English spelling of 홍, in hanja, it means "wide" or "big".

Clans

As with all Korean family names, the holders of the Hong surname are divided into different patrilineal clans, or lineages, based on their ancestral seat. Most such clans trace their lineage back to a specific founder. This system was at its height under the yangban aristocracy of the Joseon Dynasty, but it remains in use today.  There are approximately 241 such clans claimed by South Koreans. 
Historically, there had been 10 clans known but currently there are four clans remaining. Hong clans include Namyang, Pungsan, Bugye, and Hongju.

Namyang clan
The biggest clan is Namyang clan whose founder was Hong Eun-yeol in the Goryeo Dynasty. Another founder of this clan was Hong Seon-haeng.  Thus, the Namyang Hong clan is unique among Korean surnames in that it includes two separate unrelated family lines.

Pungsan clan
All ancestry of Andong's Pungsan Hong may be traced to the Goryeo dynasty's Hong Ji-gyeong, later known as a great master of Korean classical verse in the Joseon Dynasty. The Pungsan Hong were known as yangban among yangbans. Hong Jin was a direct descendant of Hong Ji-gyeong.

List from the past
Famous Koreans from the past with this family name:
 Hong Gildong, main character of a book attributed to Heo Gyun (1569–1618)
 Hong Dae-yong (1731-1783), was a Silhak scholar, astronomer and mathematician 
 Hong Gyeong-nae (1771–1812), a leader of a farmer's revolt during Joseon Dynasty

Current notable people
 Sin Cha Hong (born 1943), South Korean avant-garde dancer 
 Euny Hong, Korean American journalist and author 
 Francis Hong Yong-ho (1906–?), Roman Catholic prelate in North Korea 
 Hong Chul (born 1990), South Korean footballer
 Gene Hong, Korean American actor, producer, and screenwriter
 Hong Hei-Kyung (born 1959), Korean-American operatic soprano
 Jay Hong (born 1986), South Korean singer-songwriter and producer
 Hong Jeong-ho (born 1989), South Korean footballer
 Hong Jin (1877–1946), Korean independence activist, leader of the Korean independence movement
 Hong Joon-pyo (born 1953), South Korean politician and former prosecutor
 Hong Jung-wook (born 1970), South Korean entrepreneur, businessman, and politician
 Hong Jin-kyung (born 1977), South Korean entrepreneur, model, actress and comedian
 Hong Jin-young (born 1985), South Korean trot singer
 Hong Jong-hyun (born 1990), South Korean model and actor
 Hong Jung-eun (born 1974), one-half of South Korean screenwriting duo Hong Sisters
 Hong Kyung (born 1996), South Korean actor
 Hong Kyung-min (born 1976), South Korean singer
 Hong Mi-ran (born 1977), one-half of South Korean screenwriting duo Hong Sisters
 Hong Myung-bo (born 1969), South Korean footballer and manager
 Nansook Hong (born 1966), daughter-in-law of Sun Myung Moon
 Hong Sa-ik (1889–1946), highest-ranking ethnic Korean general in the Imperial Japanese Army, executed for war crimes
 Hong Sang-soo (born 1960), South Korean film director and screenwriter
 Hong Seok-cheon (born 1971), South Korean actor famous for publicly coming out
 Hong Seok-hyun (born 1949), South Korean media corporation executive
 Seokju Hong (born 2003), South Korean footballer
 Hong Song-nam (1929–2009), former premier of North Korea
 Hong Sook-ja (born 1933), South Korean diplomat, writer, and first female presidential candidate
 Hong Yong-Jo (born 1982), North Korean footballer
 DPR Live (born Hong Dabin, 1993), South Korean rapper
 Giriboy (born Hong Siyoung, 1991), South Korean rapper

See also
 Korean name
 List of Korean family names
 Hong (surname), the Chinese equivalent

Korean-language surnames